Dabney Smith Carr (March 5, 1802 – March 24, 1854) was an American newspaper publisher, diplomat, and the grand-nephew of Thomas Jefferson, the third President of the United States.

He was born to Peter Carr and Hester Smith-Carr in Albemarle County, Virginia and was the grandson of Dabney Carr and Martha Jefferson Carr (Thomas Jefferson's sister). He married a woman named Sidney Nichols. He served as the United States Minister Resident to the Ottoman Empire from 1843 to 1849. Carr died in 1854 in Charlottesville, Virginia. He was interred at the family cemetery at Thomas Jefferson's home, Monticello, in Charlottesville.

Sources 
Narrative Of The United States Expedition To The River Jordan And The Dead Sea, by Lieutenant William Francis Lynch, U.S.N., 1849, Chapter I on WikiSource.
Appletons' Cyclopedia Of American Biography v.1

External links 
History of Monticello graveyard

1802 births
1854 deaths
Jefferson family
People from Albemarle County, Virginia
Burials at Monticello
19th-century American diplomats
Ambassadors of the United States to the Ottoman Empire